The Rover may refer to:

The Rover (novel) by Joseph Conrad
The Rover (play) by Aphra Behn
The Rover (1967 film) by Terence Young
The Rover (2014 film) by David Michôd
"The Rover" (Led Zeppelin song)
"The Rover" (Interpol song)
"The Irish Rover", a traditional Irish song
The Rover (comics) - an old DC Thomson boys paper. Published from 4 March 1922, it was merged with the Wizard in 1963, ceasing publication in 1978.
The Rover, a Canadian online arts journal published by Marianne Ackerman

See also
 Rover (disambiguation)